Byramjee Jeejeebhoy CSI (1822–1890) was an Indian businessman and philanthropist who founded several education institutions in Bombay. The Byramjee Jeejeebhoy College and the Byramjee Jeejeebhoy Parsee Charitable Institution in Charni Road, South Mumbai, Byramjee Jeejeebhoy Medical College in Pune and the B. J. Medical College Ahmedabad are four of the notable schools and colleges founded by him. Also given to Byramjee was Land's End, Bandra, a cape with the Bandra Fort that became known as the Byramjee Jeejeebhoy Point for an annual rent of Rs. 2800. Byramjee built a beautiful, large mansion as his personal home on the hill overlooking the fort.

Bandstand Road
Byramjee Jeejeebhoy built a road parallel to the sea in Bandra named as Byramjee Jeejeebhoy Road which runs from St. Andrews to Lands End, at his own expense and was opened to the public in 1878. A stone recording this event can still be seen at the junction of Jeejeebhoy Road and Bhaba Road in Bandra.

A horse racing prize, the Byramjee Jeejeebhoy Eclipse Stakes Of India, is named after him.

References

Businesspeople from Mumbai
1822 births
1890 deaths
People from British India
Parsi people
Parsi people from Mumbai
19th-century Indian philanthropists
19th-century Indian people
19th-century Indian businesspeople